Wilhelm Schraml (26 June 1935 – 8 November 2021) was a German Roman Catholic prelate, who served as a bishop of the Roman Catholic Diocese of Passau.

Schraml was born in Regensburg. He was ordained a priest on 29 June 1961 for the Diocese of Regensburg. In 1971 he became chairman of Kolpingwerk. In 1983 he became a member of the chapter of the diocese of Regensburg.

In 1986 he was appointed an Auxiliary Bishop of Regensburg. On 8 March 1986, he was created titular bishop of Munatiana. On 13 December 2001, he was appointed bishop of Passau and installed on 23 February 2002.

Following canon law, Schraml offered his resignation to the Pope in 2010, upon reaching the age of 75. He retired on 1 October 2012.

References

External links 
Catholic Hierarchy bio 

1935 births
2021 deaths
People from Regensburg
Roman Catholic bishops of Passau
20th-century German Roman Catholic bishops
20th-century German Roman Catholic priests